Gene Elliott Thornton Jr. (born August 18, 1973), better known by his stage name No Malice (formerly known as Malicious and later Malice), is an American rapper from Virginia Beach, Virginia. He is best known for being one half of hip hop duo Clipse, alongside his brother and fellow rapper Pusha T. No Malice released his solo debut album Hear Ye Him, in 2013, and his second studio album, Let the Dead Bury the Dead, in 2017.

Life and career

1973–2009: Early life and Clipse
No Malice was born Gene Elliott Thornton Jr. on August 18, 1973, in The Bronx borough of New York City. He and his family later moved down south to Virginia Beach. He and his brother, Pusha T, formed the rap group Clipse in 1992, and later were introduced to fellow Virginian Pharrell Williams, one half of the high-profile production team The Neptunes. Impressed with their lyrical talents, Williams formed a working relationship with the duo. He eventually helped them secure a recording contract with Elektra Records, in 1997. Under Elektra, and with The Neptunes handling its production, Clipse recorded their debut album Exclusive Audio Footage. The group's debut single "The Funeral", helped to generate fan interest in the album, but failed to make a significant commercial impact. With "The Funeral" deemed a failure, Exclusive Audio Footage itself was shelved indefinitely. Clipse were subsequently released from their recording contract shortly thereafter.

In early 2001, Williams signed the duo to Arista Records, through his recently established Star Trak Entertainment imprint. Clipse released their commercial debut Lord Willin', on August 20, 2002. The album debuted at No. 1 on Billboard'''s Top R&B/Hip-hop Album chart and No. 4 on the Billboard 200, fueled by the strength of the lead singles "Grindin'" and "When the Last Time", which peaked at No. 30 and No. 19 respectively, on the Billboard Hot 100. The album's third single "Ma, I Don't Love Her" (featuring Faith Evans), was a modest hit, reaching No. 86 on the Hot 100. On October 1, 2002—only a month after its release—Lord Willin' was certified gold by the Recording Industry Association of America (RIAA).

In late 2003, Clipse began recording material for its second album, Hell Hath No Fury. However, further work on the album ground to a halt in 2004, when Arista Records's urban artists were absorbed into its sister label Jive Records as part of a larger merger between Sony Music Entertainment and BMG. Due to contractual requirements, Clipse was forced to stay on Jive, while Star Trak and the rest of its roster moved to a new home at Interscope Records. While Clipse resumed work on the album, and eventually finished its recording, the duo became increasingly frustrated with Jive, as the label overlooked it in favor of the more pop-oriented acts on its roster, which caused numerous delays in the release of Hell Hath No Fury. As delays continued, the group asked for a formal release from its contract. When Jive refused to grant this request, the duo sued the label.

On May 9, 2006, Clipse finally reached an agreement with Jive Records to release the album through its own label, Re-Up Records, along with Jive. Hell Hath No Fury was finally released on November 28, 2006. It spawned two singles: "Mr. Me Too" with Pharrell Williams and "Wamp Wamp (What It Do)" with Slim Thug. While the album received a great deal of critical acclaim, its sales were modest, at 78,000 in the first week. The hip hop magazine XXL gave the album a "XXL" rating, marking it as a five-star album. At the time only five albums had previously received that honor. In a May 19, 2007 interview with Eye Weekly, Clipse revealed that the group had been officially released from its recording contract with Jive. After this, the duo began discussions with several record labels, eventually signing with Columbia Records on October 26, 2007. The follow-up to Hell Hath No Fury, titled Til the Casket Drops, was released on December 8, 2009 via Columbia Records. In a departure from the group's previous works, which only featured production from the Neptunes, the album features production from Sean "Diddy" Combs' production team The Hitmen, and DJ Khalil among others. The album did not fare as well commercially as the group's first two albums, peaking at No. 41 on the Billboard 200 albums chart.

2010–present: Solo career and Hear Ye Him
In April 2010, No Malice announced that he and Pusha T would release solo albums later in the year, and that they were no longer signed to Columbia Records. In 2011 No Malice published his book Wretched, Pitiful, Poor, Blind & Naked, a memoir about his life, including fearing contracting AIDS, as well as his conversion to Christianity.

On March 6, 2012, he announced that he changed his name from Malice to No Malice via a video posted to Twitter. It depicted No Malice viewing himself in a casket in a funeral parlor and walking away. The video, which was directed by No Malice, opens with multiple quotes from the Bible: first, from Ephesians 4:31, "Let all bitterness and wrath and anger and clamor and slander be put away from you, along with all malice;" then, from 1 Peter 2:1, "Wherefore laying aside all malice, and all guile, and hypocrisies, and envies, and all evil speakings;" and Romans 1:29, "Being filled with all unrighteousness, fornication, wickedness, covetousness, maliciousness; full of envy, murder, debate, deceit, malignity; whisperers;" and Colossians 3:8, "But now you must put them all away: anger, wrath, malice, slander, and obscene talk from your mouth."

In 2012, No Malice collaborated with Lecrae on his mixtape Church Clothes, on the song "Darkest Hour". On June 19, 2012, No Malice released the first single from Hear Ye Him titled "June" featuring Eric David. On July 24, 2012, the second single from Hear Ye Him titled "Unforgettable" was released. On January 15, 2013, the third single from Hear Ye Him titled "Smoke & Mirrors" featuring Ab-Liva was released. On May 21, 2013, it was announced that his debut album Hear Ye Him would be released on July 2, 2013, but the album was later pushed back. On June 4, 2013, the fourth single from Hear Ye Him titled "Bury That" was released.

On August 18, 2017, No Malice released his second studio album, Let the Dead Bury the Dead, which contains the track Fake News, where No Malice denounces his earlier work, singing "Take my catalog, I just as soon set a match to it / Money like a side chick, I ain't that attached to it".

On July 6, 2018, his single "Give 'Em Game" was released. A reviewer on Jam The Hype wrote, "No Malice spits timeless bars that listeners will gain wisdom from."

He and his brother made a guest appearance as Clipse on the track "Use This Gospel" on Kanye West's 2019 album Jesus Is King''.

In 2022, they have collaborated on Japanese DJ Nigo’s album, titled “I Know NIGO!” on a song called “Punch Bowl”. The following month, they collaborated on brother Pusha T’s album, titled “It’s Almost Dry”, on a song called “I Pray For You”. He is credited as Malice on the record.

Discography

Studio albums

Guest appearances

References

1972 births
Living people
African-American male rappers
Rappers from the Bronx
East Coast hip hop musicians
Musicians from Virginia Beach, Virginia
Rappers from Virginia
African-American Christians
21st-century American rappers
21st-century American male musicians
21st-century African-American musicians
20th-century African-American people
Performers of Christian hip hop music